Eagle Lake is a lake in Alberta. It is located just southeast of the town of Strathmore.

Eagle Lake
Wheatland County, Alberta